Pasyih , located at  is a village in Laskein C.D. Block near Jowai in the West Jaintia Hills district of Meghalaya state of India.Pasyih is a part of three contiguous villages:
 A small settlement commonly known as Phra Mer (8th Mile), so called because of its distance from Jowai)
 The village of Muthlong
 The village of Pasyih.

Phra Mer is a melting pot of migrants from all over the state as well as the country. It is known for the coal deposits along (National Highway 44) that come from nearby coal mines. Pasyih and Muthlong lie away from the highway, en route to Mynso village and Shangpung/Garampani (Jowai-Garampani-Umrangso Road), respectively.

References

Villages in West Jaintia Hills district
West Jaintia Hills district